El Cardal Airport,  is an airport serving the Río Bueno commune in the Los Ríos Region of Chile.

See also

Transport in Chile
List of airports in Chile

References

External links
OpenStreetMap - El Cardal
OurAirports - El Cardal
FallingRain - El Cardal Airport

Airports in Los Ríos Region